Massachusetts Route 134 is a  north–south state highway entirely within the town of Dennis on Cape Cod in the U.S. state of Massachusetts. The route crosses north through Dennis, crossing US 6 at a cloverleaf interchange mid-way through. Route 134 ends at a junction with Route 6A in East Dennis, not far from Cape Cod Bay. 

Route 134 was formerly a segment of Route 24, added about 1951.

Route description

Route 134 begins at an intersection with Route 28 (Main Street) in the Barnstable County town of Dennis. Located in the South Dennis neighborhood on Cape Cod, Route 134 proceeds north through South Dennis, the highway passes through a commercial center, serving as the main north–south highway. After the junction with Center Street, the route passes east of Fresh Pond, crosses Upper County Road, entering downtown South Dennis. A short distance north, Route 134 leaves South Dennis for the town of Dennis, becoming a four-lane highway and crossing a former railroad right-of-way that is now the beginning of the Cape Cod Rail Trail.

After the Cape Cod Rail Trail, the area around Route 134 becomes a bunch of strip malls, condominiums and industrial buildings. The route then enters a cloverleaf interchange (exits 78A-B) with US 6 (Mid-Cape Highway). After US 6, Route 134 continues north through Dennis, consolidated to a two-lane road through local areas of Dennis. Passing recreational facilities in Dennis, the route crosses Setucket Road before turning northward again. Route 134 passes west of Dennis Pines Golf Course and its access road. After a minor curve to the northwest, Route 134 reaches its northern terminus at a junction with Route 6A (Main Street). The road continues north as Bridge Street in the East Dennis section of Dennis, heading to the Cape Cod Bay.

History
This highway has maintained the same route since at least 1930. Once named Route 24, it was renamed sometime in the past to its current name before 1951, when the current Route 24 was opened. A one mile (1.6 km) section south of Route 6 was widened to four lanes in the 1980s due to heavy commercial development. The remainder of the highway is mostly residential.

Around 2001, the original half-clover interchange with US Route 6 was upgraded to a full cloverleaf interchange. This was done because of heavy traffic making it hard to get on and off the exit ramps. As a result of this, the original exit numbering of Exit 9 on route 6 was changed to Exits 9A-B, Exit 9A for Route 134 South and Exit 9B for Route 134 North.

Major intersections

References

134
Transportation in Barnstable County, Massachusetts